Amata cyanea is a moth of the subfamily Arctiinae. It was described by George Hampson in 1914. It is found in Uganda.

References

 

Endemic fauna of Uganda
cyanea
Moths described in 1914
Moths of Africa